The Cybook Gen1 (formally Cybook) was an e-reader originally made by the French company Cytale, which filed for bankruptcy in 2003.  Two engineers of Cytale founded Bookeen and bought the rights to the Cybook. They completely remade the integrated OS and application, and then sold it as the Cybook Gen1.

This product is now discontinued. It was replaced by the Cybook Gen3, a smaller, lighter device.

See also
List of e-book readers – other similar devices
Cybook Gen3
Cybook Opus – The newer product in the Bookeen line of product

Dedicated ebook devices